The Werakata National Park is a protected national park that is located in the Lower Hunter Region of New South Wales, in eastern Australia. The  national park is located to the north, east and south of the town of Cessnock (the park is separated into three distinct but closely located sections: near Abermain, near Kearsley and near Kitchener/Abernethy).

The national park lies within the Hunter Valley Important Bird Area.

South of the national park is the separate Werakata State Conservation Area.

History
Originally called Lower Hunter National Park, the Werakata National Park was created in January 1999 with land that had previously been part of the  Cessnock State Forest (State Forest No. 874).

The Hunter region was inhabited by the Awabakal, Worimi, Wonnarua, Geawegal, Birrpai and Darkinjung Aboriginal tribes, although little is known about Aboriginal use of the area in the vicinity of the park. After European settlement in the 1800s, forestry commenced and sawmills were established in and near area the area of the park (most of the timber going to local mines for pit props). The Cessnock and Aberdare State Forests were declared in 1942 and 1963 respectively and logging continued until the forests were transferred to the NSW National Parks and Wildlife Service.

Flora and fauna
When the park was first gazetted, the Spotted Gum-Ironbark vegetation communities found on the park were identified as being poorly represented in the regional reserve system.

The park is home to several threatened species including:
 Squirrel glider
 Grey-headed flying fox
 Regent honeyeater
 Swift parrot

Other features
 Astills Picnic Area
 Kurri Sand Swamp Woodland.
 Bushwalking (walking up to Tomalpin hill)
 Bicycle trails  (leave from Astills picnic area, along Deadmans Trail and return to the picnic area via Gibsons Road).
 An old Forestry Hut (off Old Maitland Road).

See also

 Protected areas of New South Wales

References

External links

National parks of the Hunter Region
City of Cessnock
1999 establishments in Australia
Important Bird Areas of New South Wales
Protected areas established in 1999